The Betz mystery sphere is a small metal sphere with a diameter of  and weighing . It is the topic of many conspiracy theories.

Background
On March 27, 1974, the Betz family investigated a small brush fire near their residence in Ft. George Island, Florida. The family of three, Antoine, Jerri, and son Terry, came across a small metal sphere the size of a bowling ball. Their first thought was the sphere had been a cannonball left from New World conquistadors. They decided to take the sphere back to their house.

Several days later, Terry was playing the guitar in their home. The sphere seemed to react to the sound of the guitar. It made a throbbing noise. Later, the sphere was noticed to roll on its own and even stop on its own and change direction. Terry started doing experiments with the sphere. He noticed the sphere would reverberate when hit with a hammer. He also found the sphere would move after being shaken and placed on the ground.

The Betzes reported that the sphere moved on its own several times, and that it would follow people around the house seemingly on its own. Eventually, they stored the sphere in a trunk, and only took it out to show friends and family.

Analysis

A 2012 analysis by Skeptoid revealed contemporary media analysis on a similar shaped sphere indicated the Betz sphere may have been a ball check valve produced by the Bell & Howell company: its size, weight, and metallurgical composition matched those of the company's ball check valve.

Skeptoid also posited an explanation for the sphere's autonomous motion, noting that the sphere "sat quietly on display inside the Betz home for nearly two weeks, and is not reported to have ever moved on its own at all, except for when someone took it down to experiment with it", and quoting a representative of the United States Navy who stated that "I believe it's because of the construction of the house... It's old and has uneven stone floors. The ball is almost perfectly balanced, and it takes just a little indentation to make it move or change direction."

As well, Skeptoid noted coverage of New Mexico artist James Durling-Jones, who had been collecting scrap metal for use in sculptures; Durling-Jones reported having loaded ball check valves into the rooftop luggage rack of his Volkswagen Bus, and having "(driven) through the Jacksonville area around Easter of 1971, at which time a few of the balls rolled off the luggage rack and were lost." Skeptoid concluded that this was the sphere's origin.

See also
 Ball check valve
 Gravity hill (An area where physical topography produces an optical illusion)

References

Science and technology-related conspiracy theories
Ufology
Unexplained phenomena